This is a list of tablet computers, grouped by intended audience and form factor.

Media tablets
Multimedia tablets are compared in the following tables.

Larger than  screen
Following two tables compare larger than  screen multimedia tablets released in 2012 and later.

Android
This table compares multimedia tablets running Android operating systems.

iOS
This table compares multimedia tablets running iOS operating systems.

Windows
This table compares multimedia tablets running Windows operating systems.

screen
This table compares  screen (multi-)media tablets released in 2012 and later.

Android
This table compares multimedia tablets running Android operating systems.

iOS
This table compares multimedia tablets running iOS operating systems.

Windows
This table compares multimedia tablets running Windows operating systems.

Older

2011

screen and larger
This table compares  and larger screen (multi-)media tablets released in 2011.

screen
This table compares  screen (multi-)media tablets released in 2011.

2010

screen and larger
This table compares  and larger screen (multi-)media tablets released in 2010.

screen
This table compares  screen (multi-)media tablets released in 2010.

2009 and earlier

This table compares (multi-)media tablets released in 2009 and earlier.

Industrial tablets

This table compares tablet computers designed to be used by professionals in various harsh environmental conditions. Most of them are rugged. Some are meant to be mounted in vehicles or used as terminals.

Convertible tablets

Hybrid tablets

See also
 Tablet computer
 Comparison of e-book readers
 Comparison of netbooks
 Slate phone, a mobile phone form factor
 Comparison of portable media players
 Smartbook
 Ultra-mobile PC

External links
 Annotated bibliography of references to gesture and pen computing
 Notes on the History of Pen-based Computing (YouTube)
 Tablet News

References

List
Linux-based devices
Computing comparisons
Tablet computers